The following list of Swiss football champions lists all past winners of the top-tier football competitions for clubs in Switzerland. It includes all winners of the present-day Swiss Super League as well as the predecessor leagues played in the country. Swiss champions have been officially determined since the 1898–1899 season.

Key

Serie A (1898–1931)

National League (1931–1944)

National League A (1944–2003)

Super League (2003–present)

Records

By club

By canton

See also
Football in Switzerland

References

External links
 Switzerland - List of Champions, RSSSF.com

champions
champions
Switzerland